The Birth of Soul: The Complete Atlantic Rhythm and Blues Recordings is a 3-CD box set compilation by Ray Charles, released in 1991.

Critical reception 
In a contemporary review, Peter Watrous of The New York Times said that the box set "tracks the progress of a figure who profoundly changed what was possible in American music." He ranked it as the twelfth best album of 1991. The Birth of Soul was voted the third best reissue of the year in The Village Voices annual Pazz & Jop critics' poll for 1991.

In 2003, the album was ranked number 54 on Rolling Stone magazine's list of the 500 greatest albums of all time, maintaining the rating in a 2012 revised list, then dropping to number 210 in a 2020 reboot of the list. In a retrospective article for the magazine, Robert Christgau wrote that, despite "caveats" such as material repeated on more "economic" releases, The Birth of Soul is "the rockingest Charles long-form you can buy" and remarked on the legacy of its recordings:

 
Christgau recommended Rhino Entertainment's 1994 compilation album The Best of Ray Charles: The Atlantic Years as a cheaper alternative to the box set.

Track listing

References

External links

Albums produced by Jerry Wexler
Albums produced by Ahmet Ertegun
Ray Charles compilation albums
1991 compilation albums
Atlantic Records compilation albums